"Jet Star" is a steel roller coaster located at Luna Park in La Palmyre, France. It was formerly located at Knoebels Amusement Resort in Elysburg, Pennsylvania and at Morey's Piers in Wildwood, NJ. The ride is a standard production model Schwarzkopf Jet Star, which is a compact ride featuring many small dips and turns.

Jet Star was originally built in 1972 and located in Germany before being imported into the United States in 1976 into the hands of an independent operator near Astroland of Coney Island. Following the operator's financial troubles, the roller coaster was repossessed and sold to Knoebels Amusement Resort where it opened in 1977. The Jet Star operated at Knoebels until 1992, when it was sold and relocated to Morey's Piers in Wildwood, NJ. In its place, Whirlwind was added to Knoebels attraction lineup. Jet Star was eventually sold again to Luna Park La Palmyre in 1999 where it now operates, as Morey's Piers executed plans to replace it with RC-48.

Incidents
In 1997, a young boy fell out of a train when the emergency brakes were engaged to stop the ride. The ride did not include seat belts or any other restraints, and the cause of the accident is believed to be a result of engaging the emergency braking system as one train approached too closely to another.

References

Portable roller coasters
Former roller coasters in New Jersey
Morey's Piers